The Cururu River is a river of Pará state in north-central Brazil.

The river flows through the Itaituba I National Forest, a  sustainable use conservation area established in 1998.
The lower part of the river flows through the Mundurucu Indigenous Territory.

See also
List of rivers of Pará

References

Brazilian Ministry of Transport

Rivers of Pará